Onorato Damen (4 December 1893 – 14 October 1979), was an Italian left communist revolutionary who was first active in the Italian Socialist Party and then the Communist Party of Italy. After being expelled, he worked with the organized Italian left, became one of the leaders of the Internationalist Communist Party, commonly known by their paper Battaglia Comunista. 

The Internationalist Communist Party, formally founded in 1943, was numerically the largest left communist organization in the post-World War II period. In 1952, Amadeo Bordiga, who had by then fully come out of retirement, split the party to found the International Communist Party, known by its paper Programma Comunista. A majority followed Damen, whose group maintained the original name Internationalist Communist Party, the original theoretical journal Prometeo, as well as the paper Battaglia Communista. Onorato Damen was politically active his entire adult life. He was the author of books Bordiga Beyond the Myth and Gramsci: Between Marxism and Idealism.

Biography
Damen was born in Monte San Pietrangeli (Fermo). In his youth, he joined the Italian Socialist Party (PSI), within which he opposed the politics of Turati, Treves and Modigliani. A little more than twenty years old at the start of the First World War, he was drafted as a Sergeant. At the end of the hostilities he was demoted to the rank of private and subsequently condemned to two years of military prison by a military tribunal for "endangering public institutions"; this was essentially for his support of revolutionary defeatism, motivated by "incitement to desertion" and for denouncing the "imperialistic character of the war". Set free in 1919, he returned to his position in the party collaborating on the socialist periodical of Fermo La Lotta (The Struggle).

In the two biennio rosso of 1920–21, the richest period of political and social tensions, Damen worked first in Bologna with the local Trade Union Council and then with the Casa del Popolo ("House of the People") of Granarolo as the secretary of the Community Legal Committee.

During this period, Damen supported Amadeo Bordiga, and thus joined the Communist Party of Italy. In the months immediately preceding the split of Livorno he worked as secretary of the Trade Union Council in Pistoia and as the chief editor of the periodical L'avvenire. He remained in Pistoia up to his arrest in the months of the electoral campaign of 1921 for the action from Poggio a Caiano.

Already in February 1921 he was denounced by the judiciary for certain violence of language used during a rally in the Piazza Garibaldi in Pistoia. On the basis of his frenetic activity and, above the events at Empoli, he became one of the principal targets of the nascent fascist reaction in Tuscany, where he had been organising during those months. On May 10 while returning from a rally held on behalf of the candidate of the Communist Party of Italy in the elections in the village of Corbezzi, he was detained by the fascists who took him to their offices in the city. Here they tried to beat him into renouncing his "Bolshevik" ideas. Failing in their first objective, he was transferred to their headquarters at Piazza Ottaviani in Florence. He was sent to Dumini with the proposal: "You should disappear for the entire period of the electoral campaign or hide yourself in a villa in Fiesole or remain in Florence under continual surveillance."

Rejecting these proposals, he was held in Dumini throughout the general strike; a protest erupted into violence in Pistoia on his release. Renewing contacts with the party and overcoming the reserve of the comrades, he decided to return to Pistoia where he remained in order to continue the task of agitation. On the return trip, made by car under the escort of a certain number of armed comrades, he encountered a squadron of fascists on the road from Pioppo to Caiano. This encounter resulted in the death of a fascist and the wounding of two others. Damen was sentenced to three years confinement in the Murate in Florence.

Given what took place en route from Pioppo to Caiano and the subsequent incarceration, the leadership of the party decided to send him to France as a part of their "political bureau" to represent the party and to preside over the organisation of groups of exiled comrades, coordinating their political activity as the director of the weekly L'humanité in Italian. Later, upon his clandestine re-entry in the country in 1924, the party presented him as a candidate in the elections and in spite of the strong opposition of the fascists was elected as a deputy on the city council of Florence.

Meanwhile, within the PCdI, the rupture between the direction imposed by Moscow and the left continued to delineate itself more clearly. Bordiga, who enjoyed widespread support within the party, initiated his "Aventine" cession (named from a famous plebeian revolt in ancient Rome 4th century BC). He attended the meeting of the central committee but did not intervene in the debate, thus not obstructing the change in political direction that was supported by Antonio Gramsci and Palmiro Togliatti.

Damen was a supporter of Communist Left, not the new party direction. Togliatti attended a meeting of the central committee of the Florentine Federation of the CPI to discuss the position of Damen – although Damen himself was not invited. The meeting was unguarded and so the police were able to disrupt it – ultimately, it ended in a flight following a false alarm.

In 1925, Damen, along with Luigi Repossi and Bruno Fortichiari, formed the "Intesa" committee with the aim of defending the work of the left in the party. The Platform of the Committee of Intesa was hailed by Leon Trotsky as a seminal work of the International Left Opposition referring to it in his writings as the Platform of the Left.

In November 1926, Damen was imprisoned in Ustica, while in December of the same year he was arrested and sent again to the Murate in Florence for participating in the action of Florentine communists in plotting against the state. Condemned by a special tribunal to 12 years of seclusion, he spent years in prisons in Saluzzo, Pallanza, Civitavecchia (where he led a prison revolt) and in Pianosa. Released under amnesty at the end of 1933, he was sent to Milan under watch for 5 years, while the head of the prison in Pianosa communicated to the Casellaria Centrale that "the punishment he has suffered has had no moral effect" and described him as an "unshakeable communist".

He was again arrested at the end of 1935, and in 1937 for spreading communist propaganda about the Spanish Civil War, denouncing the stalinists. At the time, police sources testified, he "did not participate in the propaganda turn of the clandestine reorganisation of the Italian Communist Party" because, remaining faithful to his Left-Communist orientation, Damen diffused the propaganda of the international opposition against the politics of the Comintern and against Stalinism in Spain".

Arrested again at the outbreak of the Second World War, he was confined for the entire period of the war. He was finally released by the Marshal Badoglio regime at the end of the war.

Damen was in prison when the Internationalist Communist Party was launched, but his alignment with it was well known. In 1945, Togliatti and the PCI, while advocating the freedom of real fascists, petitioned in the CLN to have the leaders of the Internationalist Communist Party condemned to death as saboteurs and with the calumnious label of agents of the Gestapo; they included Damen in their list of its leaders. Togliatti's Italian Communist Party had already assassinated two of their founding members and organizers, Fausto Atti and Mario Acquaviva.

In the early 1950s, Bordiga began calling for a return to the positions of the Italian Communist Left as they were in the early 1920s when he was the leader of the Communist Party of Italy. To that end he founded the International Communist Party, which then launched their paper, Il Programma Comunista. The group around Battaglia Comunista (and their theoretical journal Prometeo) disagreed, instead defending the following positions:

 Rosa Luxemburg and not Lenin was right on the national question.
 The old Communist Parties (now fully stalinised) were not centrist but bourgeois.
 There was no hope of conquering the unions and that new strategies towards the daily class struggle would have to be evolved to connect the daily struggle of the class to the longer term struggle for communism.
 The USSR was neither a communist nor socialist society but state capitalist.
 There could be no substitution of the party for the class as a whole.

In the 1970s, the Internationalist Communist Party around Prometeo and Battaglia Comunista organized the first of the International Conferences of the Communist Left. Out of these conferences. the Internationalist Communist Party and the Communist Workers Organisation together formed the International Bureau for the Revolutionary Party around the basis of a common platform (the IBRP became the Internationalist Communist Tendency in 2009 and is still active to this day). Damen died in 1979.

References

External links
 The Onorato Damen Internet Archive (EN)
 The Thirtieth Anniversary of the Death of Onorato Damen (EN)
 Articles of Damen translated in English (EN)
 Articles in Battaglia Comunista (IT)
 Scritti scelti, 1943-78 (IT)
 Gramsci tra marxismo e idealismo (IT)
 Amadeo Bordiga - Validità e limiti d'una esperienza (IT)
 Istituto Onorato Damen

Left communists
Italian anti-capitalists
Italian communists
Bordigism
1893 births
1979 deaths
People from the Province of Fermo
Italian Aventinian secessionists